Mustvee River is a river in Jõgeva County, Estonia. The river is 43.3 km long and basin size is 179.5 km2. It runs into Peipus Lake.

References

Rivers of Estonia
Jõgeva County